This is a list of lighthouses in the Federated States of Micronesia.

Chuuk Lighthouses

Kosrae Lighthouses

Pohnpei Lighthouses

Yap Lighthouses

See also
 Lists of lighthouses and lightvessels

References

External links
 

Federated States of Micronesia
Lighthouses